HSC Adriana is a catamaran type passenger ship owned by Croatian shipping company Jadrolinija. It has a capacity of 325 passengers.

References

Passenger ships
Passenger ships of Croatia
1992 ships